The World Allround Speed Skating Championships for Men took place on 9 and 10 February 1991 in Heerenveen at the Thialf ice rink.

Title holder was the Norwegian Johann Olav Koss.

Classification

  * = Fell
  DQ = Disqualified

Source:

References

World Allround Speed Skating Championships, 1991
1991 World Allround

Attribution
In Dutch